Richard "Richie" Guillermo Menjivar Peraza (born October 31, 1990) is a Salvadoran international footballer, who plays as a midfielder for Chalatenango.

Career
After spending his college career at University of Evansville and Cal State Bakersfield, Menjivar spent time with amateur side Cal FC during their dramatic 2012 Lamar Hunt U.S. Open Cup run which saw them defeat Kitsap Pumas, Wilmington Hammerheads and Portland Timbers before suffering a 5-0 defeat to Seattle Sounders FC in the Round of 16.

On 8 February 2013, Menjivar joined the Atlanta Silverbacks of the NASL, helping the team win the 2013 Spring Championship. At the end of the entire season, he was awarded a spot on the league's 2013 best XI.

In February 2014, after trialing with the Portland Timbers, he signed with the San Antonio Scorpions.

On April 29, 2015, Menjivar was traded to the Tampa Bay Rowdies in exchange for defender Brad Rusin. Menjivar's contract with the Rowdies expired on December 16, 2015.

Menjivar signed with NASL expansion team Rayo OKC on February 25, 2016.

International
Menjivar has represented the United States in the under-18 level and was also on El Salvador's Olympic Qualifying roster in 2012.

On January 18, 2013, Menjivar made his senior debut for El Salvador in their opening match of the 2013 Copa Centroamericana which resulted in a 1-1 draw with Honduras. On September 7, 2014, he scored his first international goal against Honduras in a group stage match during the 2014 Copa Centroamericana.

International goals

Honors

Club
Atlanta Silverbacks
Champion
NASL Spring Season (1): 2013
San Antonio Scorpions
Champion
NASL Fall Season (1): 2014
Soccer Bowl (1): 2014

Individual
NASL Best XI: 2013

References

External links

Cal State Bakersfield bio

1990 births
Living people
Salvadoran footballers
El Salvador international footballers
American soccer players
United States men's youth international soccer players
American expatriate soccer players
American sportspeople of Salvadoran descent
Citizens of El Salvador through descent
Salvadoran expatriate footballers
Evansville Purple Aces men's soccer players
Cal State Bakersfield Roadrunners men's soccer players
Cal FC players
Jammerbugt FC players
Atlanta Silverbacks players
San Antonio Scorpions players
Tampa Bay Rowdies players
Rayo OKC players
New York Cosmos (2010) players
Penn FC players
Association football midfielders
Soccer players from California
Expatriate men's footballers in Denmark
North American Soccer League players
2013 Copa Centroamericana players
2013 CONCACAF Gold Cup players
2014 Copa Centroamericana players
2015 CONCACAF Gold Cup players
2017 Copa Centroamericana players
2017 CONCACAF Gold Cup players
People from Panorama City, Los Angeles
C.D. Águila footballers